Richard Cannon Watts was an associate justice of the South Carolina Supreme Court. He was born on March 15, 1853. Following an amendment to the South Carolina Constitution, a fourth seat on the South Carolina Supreme Court was added, and Richard Watts was elected by the South Carolina General Assembly to the position on January 10, 1912. Justice Watts was the first person appointed to the newly created fifth seat on the state supreme court. He had previously been serving as a state trial judge. He was married to Littie McIver, a daughter of South Carolina Supreme Court chief justice Henry McIver. Watts died on October 13, 1930, and is buried at the Laurens City Cemetery.

References

Chief Justices of the South Carolina Supreme Court
Justices of the South Carolina Supreme Court
1853 births
1930 deaths
People from Laurens, South Carolina